Norsk Landboeblad was a former Norwegian newspaper published during the early 1800s.
 
Norsk Landboeblad was published in the community of Volda in Møre og Romsdal, Norway. It had a circulation of 600, a considerable number at that time. This paper can be regarded as a predecessor to the present-day newspaper Møre, which is a local newspaper for the municipalities of Volda and Ørsta and the region of Romsdal. The newspaper is owned by Aarflots Prenteverk AS, which also operates other activities such as graphic design and printing.

In 1809, Sivert Aarflot (1759–1817) opened a print shop at the village of Egset in Volda. Norsk Landboeblad was published and printed by Sivert Aarflot from 1810 until his death in 1817.  After his death, his son Rasmus Aarflot (1792–1845) took over his father's publication and printing company.    The Sivert Aarflot Museum in Volda features equipment from the original printing works.

References

Other sources
Ottosen, Rune;  Lars Arve Røssland; Helge Østbye   (2002) Norsk Pressehistorie   (Oslo: Det Norske Samlaget)

External links
Sivert Aarflot Museum at Egset in Volda
 Møre website
Aarflots Prenteverk AS website

Publications established in 1810
Publications disestablished in 1817
Defunct newspapers published in Norway
Mass media in Møre og Romsdal
Volda
Norwegian-language newspapers